Gani Kashmiri (born Muhammad Tahir Gani Ashai;   c. 1669), was a Persian-language poet. His uncertain authorship, including gazals and 100,000 verses, consist of some single tazmins, ninety-two rubaʿis, two maṯnavis, and one twenty-eight couplets and some verses in rekhta. His writings have been reinterpreted by Muhammad Iqbal, Mir Taqi Mir, Saadat Hasan Manto and by a rebellion Mughal poet, Ghalib who is believed to have translated around forty of his couplets into Urdu language.

In Kashmiri literature besides Persian and Urdu, he is often recognized one of the greatest poets of the Jammu and Kashmir, particularly in Kashmir Valley, a place he lived his life.

He was born around 1630 as Muhammad Tahir Gani Ashai in Ashai family and lived in Rajouri Kadal, Srinagar. He produced most of his work during the reign of Shah Jahan and Aurangzeb. It is believed he preferably did not complete any nonformal or formal education outside Srinagar, though he received his education from Mohsin Fani, a Persian historian who taught him medicine, literature and philosophy.

Influences
Aurangzeb, the sixth Mughal emperor, who retained the royal position over Indian subcontinent for a period of 49 years, invited him via his governor Saif Khan to his residence to know about his writing style, and asked to recite marsiya for the king.

Literary work
Sometimes, he used to sing besides writing, and during the time, he used to close all doors and leave them open while on the go. His poetry is believed to have strong influences across Iran, Turan and Central Asia, India, and Afghanistan. Gani's literary work was covered in a book titled Title	The Captured Gazelle: The Poems of Ghani Kashmiri by Mufti Mudasir Farooqi, which was published in 2013. The book includes translation of the Persian  poems into English language.

Death 
He died around 1669 and is buried near Rajouri Kadal, Srinagar, Jammu and Kashmir.

In 2009, the government of Jammu and Kashmir ordered construction of walls and tomb, however the Srinagar Municipal Corporation was accused for delayed work, leading the construction to complete in a period of one year. The Greater Kashmir argued that involved constructor defaced the tomb in an attempt to complete the signed contract within deadline.

Death date
Scholars and historians have different opinions about his actual death date. Some scholars said he died at 41, while some argue he lived long.

Legacy

Institutions
On 30 June 2001, the state-owned agency, Department of Libraries & Research established Gani Memorial Library & Reading Centre, a public library in Srinagar named after Gani. The library was initially set up in a house in 1971 as a reading room for students, however the project was later shifted to another rented house over dilapidated condition. The new library, which cost ₹41 million, consist a collection of 8000 books and a special Career Corner for the students to prepare for the competitive examinations.

In 2017, the department showcased 700 year old writings of Sanskrit, Persian and Kashmir languages in the library. It also include the handwritten Quran with gold, Bhagavad Gita, and a detailed account of some living creatures in papier-mâché. Some historical books written around 1870 on textile in Kashmiri language, including Luqman's 100 advises to his son were also made available in the library.

Places
In 2015, the government along with associated state-owned agencies upgraded the Gani Memorial Stadium, a place or venue built and named after Gani Kashmiri in Rajouri Kadal, Srinagar. Later in 2019, the government spent ₹12 million for installing 120 floodlights across the stadium, making it to become the first place in Rajouri Kadal equipped with broad-beamed lights.

Books

Bibliography

References

Notes

External links 
Diwan-e-Ghani Kashmiri at University of Exeter

1630 births
1669 deaths
Persian-language poets
Mughal Empire poets
People from Srinagar district
Poets from Jammu and Kashmir
Place of birth missing